Penelope Rich, Lady Rich, later styled Penelope Blount (née Devereux; January 1563 – 7 July 1607) was an English court office holder. She served as lady-in-waiting to the English queen Anne of Denmark. She was the sister of Robert Devereux, 2nd Earl of Essex, and is traditionally thought to be the inspiration for "Stella" of Sir Philip Sidney's Astrophel and Stella sonnet sequence (published posthumously in 1591). She was married to Robert Rich, 3rd Baron Rich (later 1st Earl of Warwick) and had a public liaison with Charles Blount, Baron Mountjoy, whom she married in an unlicensed ceremony following her divorce from Rich. She died in 1607.

Early life and first marriage
Born Penelope Devereux at Chartley Castle in Staffordshire, she was the elder daughter of Walter Devereux, 2nd Viscount Hereford, later 1st Earl of Essex and Lettice Knollys, daughter of Sir Francis Knollys and Catherine Carey, and sister of William Knollys, later 1st Earl of Banbury. Catherine Carey was the daughter of Lady Mary Boleyn by either her husband Sir William Carey, Gentleman of the Privy Chamber, or her lover King Henry VIII.

Her father was created Earl of Essex in 1572. Penelope was a child of fourteen when Sir Philip Sidney accompanied her distant cousin Queen Elizabeth I on a visit to Lady Essex in 1575, on her way from Kenilworth, and must have been frequently thrown into the society of Sidney, in consequence of the many ties between the two families. Essex died in Dublin in September 1576. He had sent a message to Philip Sidney from his death-bed expressing his desire that he should marry his daughter, and later his secretary wrote to the young man's father, Sir Henry Sidney, in words which seem to point to the existence of a very definite understanding.

Penelope's brother, Robert, Viscount Hereford, inherited the Earldom of Essex on their father's death in 1576, and Penelope, her sister Dorothy, and younger brother Walter were entrusted to the guardianship of their kinsman Henry Hastings, 3rd Earl of Huntingdon. In 1578 their widowed mother married the Queen's favourite, Robert Dudley, Earl of Leicester. Perhaps the marriage of Lady Essex with the earl of Leicester, which destroyed Philip Sidney's prospects as his uncle Leicester's heir, had something to do with the breaking off of the proposed match with Penelope.

In January 1581, she arrived at court accompanied by her guardian's wife, Catherine, Countess of Huntingdon, who was Leicester's sister and Sidney's aunt. In March 1581 Huntingdon as her guardian secured the queen's assent through Lord Burghley, Master of the Court of Wards, for her marriage with Robert Rich, 3rd Baron Rich (later 1st Earl of Warwick). Penelope is said to have protested in vain against the alliance with Rich.

Penelope's children by Robert Rich were:
Lettice Rich (d. 1619), named after her maternal grandmother Lettice Knollys and known as Lucy. Married firstly Sir George Carey and secondly Sir Arthur Lake
Essex Rich, married Sir Thomas Cheek and had three sons and five daughters
Robert Rich (1587–1658), later 2nd Earl of Warwick
Henry Rich (1590–1649), later 1st Earl of Holland

Poets' muse

Penelope Rich was considered one of the beauties of Elizabeth's court. She was golden-haired with dark eyes, a gifted singer and dancer, fluent in French, Italian, and Spanish.

Penelope is traditionally thought to have inspired Philip Sidney's sonnet sequence Astrophel and Stella (sometimes spelt Astrophil and Stella). Likely composed in the 1580s, it is the first of the famous English sonnet sequences, and contains 108 sonnets and 11 songs. Many of the poems were circulated in manuscript form before the first edition was printed by Thomas Newman in 1591, five years after Sidney's death. They were set by the French lutenist Charles Tessier and published in London in 1597.

Whether Sidney fell passionately in love with Penelope in the years between her arrival at court in 1581 and his own marriage in 1583, or whether the "Stella" sonnets were courtly amusements reflecting fashionable poetic conceits may never be known. In her essay "Sidney, Stella, and Lady Rich", Katherine Duncan-Jones writes:

Sidney died of wounds received at the Battle of Zutphen in 1586. In 1590, Penelope's brother Essex married Sidney's widow Frances, daughter of Sir Francis Walsingham, and Lady Rich was much cultivated by poets and musicians during her brother's ascendancy at court in the 1590s. Poet Richard Barnfield dedicated The Affectionate Shepherd, his first work, which was published anonymously in November 1594, to Penelope Rich. Bartholomew Yong dedicated his translation of Jorge de Montemayor's Diana (1598) to her; and sonnets are addressed to her by John Davies of Hereford.

In 1586 she was a godmother to the daughter of Nicholas Hilliard, the queen's miniaturist. Hilliard is known to have painted two miniatures of Lady Rich, in 1589 and 1590 for her brother, the Earl of Essex. He sent one to James VI of Scotland (later James I of England), and the poet Henry Constable wrote a sonnet about the portrait. Essex gave the second miniature to the French ambassador for Henry IV. A miniature in the Royal Collection (above) may be one of these. Anne of Denmark asked for portraits of the Earl of Essex and Lady Rich in December 1595.

Charles Tessier dedicated his book of part-songs in French and Italian, Le premier livre de chansons, to "Madame Riche", commending (in Italian) her musical judgement, and John Dowland composed "My Lady Rich's Galliard" in her honour.

Affair and charge of treason
Penelope's arranged marriage to Rich had been unhappy, and by 1595 she began a secret affair with Charles Blount, Baron Mountjoy. Lord Rich took no action during the lifetime of Penelope's brother, the powerful Earl of Essex, who became the ageing Queen's favourite in the years after the death of Leicester in 1588.

But Penelope was tainted by association with her brother's plotting. Essex shocked many people, after the failure of his rebellion, by denouncing her as a traitor, and after his execution for treason in 1601, Lord Rich had Penelope and her children by Mountjoy cast out. Mountjoy, like Penelope, had been implicated in the Essex rebellion, but the Queen, who wished to show as much clemency as possible to the rebels, took no action against either of them. Lady Rich moved in with her lover, and the couple began a very public relationship. Mountjoy was created Earl of Devonshire on the accession of James I, and Lady Rich was in high favour at court.

She was among the ladies who rode north to Berwick-upon-Tweed to meet Anne of Denmark in May 1603 and escorted the new queen on her entry to London. She served Anne as a Lady of the Bedchamber. She was one of the ladies in waiting "taken out" from the audience to dance during The Masque of Indian and China Knights at Hampton Court on 1 January 1604. She danced as the nymph Ocyte in Ben Jonson's Masque of Blackness on Twelfth Night 1605.

In 1605, Rich sued for a divorce, and Penelope wanted to marry Blount and legitimise their children. In the divorce proceedings, she publicly admitted to adultery. The divorce was granted, but the requests to remarry and legitimise her children were refused. She married Blount in a private ceremony conducted by his chaplain, William Laud, afterwards Archbishop of Canterbury, on 26 December 1605 at Wanstead House in London. This proceeding, carried out in defiance of canon law, was followed by the disgrace of both parties, who were banished from court by King James. The couple continued to live together as husband and wife with their children until his death a few months later. Blount died on 3 April 1606 and Penelope on 7 July 1607.

Penelope's illegitimate children acknowledged by Charles Blount were:

 Penelope Rich, who, despite her surname, was a daughter of Penelope by Blount
Mountjoy Blount (c.1597–1666), later 1st Earl of Newport
 Charles Blount
 St. John Blount
 Isabella Blount
 another child died in infancy

Notes

References  
Duncan-Jones, Katherine. "Sidney, Stella, and Lady Rich." In Sir Philip Sidney: 1586 and the Creation of a Legend, edited by J. A. van Dorsten, Dominic Baker-Smith, and Arthur F. Kinney. Brill Archive, 1986, Google Books retrieved 21 February 2009.
Hammer, P.E.J. The Polarisation of Elizabethan Politics: The Political Career of Robert Devereux, 2nd Earl of Essex, 1585–1597 Cambridge UP, 1999. 
A Historical Dictionary of British Women, Taylor & Francis Group, Routledge, 2nd revised edition 2003, 

Wilson, Mona, Sir Philip Sidney, London: Duckworth, 1931

External links
The Correspondence of Lady Penelope Rich in EMLO

1563 births
1607 deaths
English countesses
Rich
Daughters of British earls
16th-century English women
17th-century English women
16th-century English nobility
17th-century English nobility
Penelope
Penelope
Penelope
Date of birth unknown
People from the Borough of Stafford
Ladies of the Bedchamber
Household of Anne of Denmark